This is a season-by-season list of records compiled by Yale in men's ice hockey. The Yale men's team is the oldest active ice hockey team in North America, predating all current professional and amateur clubs.

Yale University has won one NCAA championship in its history, coming in 2013.

Season-by-season results

Note: GP = Games played, W = Wins, L = Losses, T = Ties

* Winning percentage is used when conference schedules are unbalanced.

Footnotes

References

 
Lists of college men's ice hockey seasons in the United States
Yale Bulldogs ice hockey seasons